This is a list of plants from India that have been considered rare, threatened, endangered, or extinct by the IUCN or the Botanical Survey of India. Some of the regions mentioned may refer to old and outdated state or regional boundaries and may need to be interpreted with caution.

The BSI status symbols used are extinct (Ex), extinct/endangered (Ex/E), endangered (E), vulnerable (V), rare (R) and indeterminate (I). Two letter state identification codes are used (see ISO 3166-2:IN) and WG stands for Western Ghats. The IUCN status is indicated where available.

Charophyta

Jungermanniopsida

Marchantiopsida

Bryopsida

Takakiopsida

Lycopodiopsida

Polypodiopsida

Cycadopsida

Pinopsida

Gnetopsida

Magnoliopsida

Liliopsida

See also 

 List of least concern plants
 List of endangered plants
 List of plants that are extinct in the wild
 List of recently extinct plants
 List of extinct animals of India
 List of endangered animals in India
 Lists of extinct species

References

External links 
Endemic and Threatened taxa, Botanical Survey of India

Threatened
Plants,India